Motilibacter rhizosphaerae is a bacterium from the genus of Motilibacter which has been isolated from rhizospheric soil from the plant Peucedanum japonicum from the Mara Island in Korea.

References

Bacteria described in 2013
Actinomycetota